"The Harder I Try (The Bluer I Get)" is a song written by Frank F. Robinson and performed by The Free Movement. It reached #6 on the US adult contemporary chart, #49 on the US R&B chart, and #50 on the Billboard Hot 100 in 1972.  The song was featured on their 1972 album, I've Found Someone of My Own.

The song was produced by Toxey French and Michael Omartian and arranged by Jimmie Haskell, Omartian, and Bill Straw.

References

1971 songs
1971 singles
The Free Movement songs
Columbia Records singles
Song recordings produced by Michael Omartian